Doushan Street is a historical residential street in She County, Anhui, China. It is named after a neighboring hill called Dou Hill by locals and is a noted tourist attraction in the area.

References

Tourist attractions in Anhui
She County, Anhui